Events from the year 1745 in Canada.

Incumbents
French Monarch: Louis XV
British and Irish Monarch: George II

Governors
Governor General of New France: Charles de la Boische, Marquis de Beauharnois
Colonial Governor of Louisiana: Pierre de Rigaud, Marquis de Vaudreuil-Cavagnial
Governor of Nova Scotia: Paul Mascarene
Commodore-Governor of Newfoundland: Richard Edwards

Events
 16 June 1745 - After a six-week siege, the French fort of Louisbourg on Cape Breton Island falls to the British colonial forces from New England organized by Governor William Shirley. This intensifies hostilities in what is known as King George's War, an extension of the European War of the Austrian Succession. The English go on to make new conquests from the French in the West Indies.

Births
 Samuel Hearne, explorer, fur-trader, author, and naturalist (died 1792)

Deaths

Historical documents
Pamphlet (written in January 1745) argues that Île-Royale must be captured to protect valuable fishery in Newfoundland

Rising British Army officer says few provisions, little gunpowder, poor discipline and leadership, and exposed defences make Louisbourg vulnerable

Massachusetts government moves (relatively) quickly to mount military expedition to take Louisbourg and Île-Royale

Siege of Louisbourg ends with French defenders and British invaders agreeing to capitulation and transfer of French to France at British expense

Governor William Shirley sends report and journal of Louisbourg siege, including details of soldiers' extremely heavy labour

"God fought for us" - Sermon crediting Providence for so many advantages of preparation, execution and luck leading to fall of Louisbourg

Photo: Monument erected by Society of Colonial Wars to the memory of New England soldiers killed at Louisbourg during siege of 1745

During siege, whaleboats were loaded with ladders and 500 soldiers and marines to take Louisbourg's Island Battery, but fog prevented attempt

"After a Dance this Day, they fell upon him" - Report of torture killing of British soldier captured near Louisbourg

"The Inhabitants were strangely surpris'd" - fire ship loaded with gunpowder used to damage King's Gate and other structures in Louisbourg

"A great deal of ill usage" - Reports of local Indigenous people being abused by British authorities after siege (Note: "savages" used)

Loss of Louisbourg eliminates France's benefit from rich North American fishery trade to Catholic Europe (Note: "savages" used)

Nova Scotia Council president Mascarene assures Acadians that none who are of mixed European and Indigenous origin will be scalped

Acadians supplying provisions to occupied Louisbourg threatened by its local Indigenous people, but those in Nova Scotia want peace

Council advised from Chignecto that Jean-Louis Le Loutre has arrived there from Quebec "with presents for the Indians"

Mascarene sternly cautions Acadians for seeking Le Loutre's permission to supply Annapolis, and then letting "11 or 12 Indians" stop them

Uncooperative and hostile actions of Acadians (listed from 1710) make them, if not "utter Enemies," then "unprofitable Inhabitants"

Quebec leaders report almost all Acadians desire "French Dominion" while amassing money as "a resource for an evil day"

Joseph Robson investigates lower Nelson River for its usefulness to Hudson's Bay Company

Joseph Robson's argument for building Hudson's Bay Company forts of stone, not wood

Map of New France covers from Grand Banks to Pays d'en Haut to Baffin Bay

English translation of Alain-René Lesage's fictionalized version of Canadian soldier/adventurer Beauchêne's exploits is published in London

References 

 
Canada
45